is a Japanese manga artist working for the company Ufotable. He is noted for the illustration of the manga version of Coyote Ragtime Show and Gakuen Utopia Manabi Straight!.

References

Manga artists
Living people
Year of birth missing (living people)
Place of birth missing (living people)